Marle is a commune in the Aisne department in Hauts-de-France in northern France.

Population

International relations
Marle is twinned with Eyemouth, Scotland, UK.

See also
 Communes of the Aisne department
 :fr:Cyclo-cross international de Marle, in French Wikipedia

References

Communes of Aisne
Aisne communes articles needing translation from French Wikipedia